Ramleh Commonwealth War Graves Commission Cemetery and Memorial to the Missing is for personnel of both World Wars and the period of Mandatory Palestine. It is located in the town of Ramla in Israel.

The cemetery grounds were assigned to the United Kingdom in perpetuity by the municipality of Ramla in recognition of the sacrifices made by the British Empire in the defence and liberation of Palestine during the war. It is the largest cemetery for Commonwealth forces in Israel.

Location
 
The cemetery lies on a plain looking towards the hills of Judea in the general direction of Jerusalem. The location is close to the site of the Battle of Junction Station (13 to 14 November 1917). The cemetery was in use throughout the period of Mandatory Palestine, including the World War II, up to the start of May 1948. British burials of the few troops who stayed until end of June 1948 in order to finish the evacuation are buried in Khayat Beach War Cemetery in Haifa.

Noted burials
One notable grave from the World War I period is that of politician and soldier Neil Primrose. Among those buried in the cemetery are the two British sergeants, Mervyn Paice and Clifford Martin, who were hanged by the Irgun in 1947 in response to the death sentences carried out on three of their members by the British Mandate authorities.

In 2010, the grave of a British soldier named Harry Potter was listed on the Ramle's tourism website after becoming a popular tourist spot following the worldwide fame of the fictional wizard with the same name.

References

External links

 
 
 
 
Commonwealth War Graves Commission cemeteries in Israel
Cemeteries in Israel
World War I memorials
World War I cemeteries
Ramla
Buildings and structures in Central District (Israel)
World War II sites in Mandatory Palestine